The Journey is a live album by 2006 Australian Idol runner-up Jessica Mauboy, released on 24 February 2007 by Sony BMG Australia. The CD/DVD contains recordings of Mauboy's live performances from her time in the top twelve on  Australian Idol. Upon its release, The Journey debuted at number four on the ARIA Albums Chart and was certified gold by the Australian Recording Industry Association.

Background and release
In 2006, Jessica Mauboy auditioned for the fourth season of Australian Idol, in Alice Springs, Northern Territory, singing "I Have Nothing" by Whitney Houston. Her audition impressed the judges, and she progressed to the semi-finals. Following the semi-final rounds, she advanced into the top twelve, and after progressing to the final two, Mauboy was announced as the runner-up to fellow contestant Damien Leith. Two weeks after the conclusion of Australian Idol, Mauboy signed a recording contract with Sony BMG Australia, and released The Journey in Australia on 24 February 2007. Released as a two-disc package, it contains re-recorded covers of the selected songs Mauboy performed as part of the top twelve on Australian Idol, and a DVD of her live performances in the series. The Journey debuted at number four on the ARIA Albums Chart and was certified gold by the Australian Recording Industry Association for shipments of 35,000 copies.

Track listing

Charts

Certifications

Release history

References

Jessica Mauboy albums
2007 debut albums
2007 live albums
2007 video albums
Live video albums
Sony Music Australia albums